Governor Chamberlain may refer to:

Abiram Chamberlain (1837–1911), 60th Governor of Connecticut
Daniel Henry Chamberlain (1835–1907), 76th Governor of South Carolina
George Earle Chamberlain (1854–1928), 11th Governor of Oregon
Joshua Chamberlain (1828–1914), 32nd Governor of Maine